Aksel Kankaanranta (born 28 January 1998) is a Finnish singer. He was due to represent Finland in the Eurovision Song Contest 2020 in Rotterdam with the song "Looking Back", before the event was cancelled due to the COVID-19 pandemic. In 2017, he finished second in The Voice of Finland. He was born in Turku.

Eurovision Song Contest 
Aksel Kankaanranta was scheduled to represent Finland at the Eurovision Song Contest 2020 in Rotterdam with the song ''Looking Back'' after winning the Finnish national selection Uuden Musiikin Kilpailu, but then on 18 March, it was cancelled because of the Coronavirus pandemic. Later that month, the Finnish national broadcaster, Yle, announced they would not internally select Aksel, and he would have to participate in UMK 2021. In episode 2 of Eurovision Home Concerts, Kankaanranta confirmed that he would audition for the 2021 edition of the national selection.

Aksel participated in the national selection for Finland in the Eurovision Song Contest 2021 with his song "Hurt". This time, he finished 5th in the final.

Kankaanranta announced the Finnish jury votes at the Eurovision Song Contest 2022.

Discography

Singles

References 

1998 births
21st-century Finnish male singers
Eurovision Song Contest entrants for Finland
Eurovision Song Contest entrants of 2020
Living people